Paolo Lorenzi and Giancarlo Petrazzuolo won in the final 7–6(5), 3–6, [10–6], against Alessio di Mauro and Manuel Jorquera.

Seeds

Draw

Draw

References
 Doubles Draw

Trofeo Bellaveglia - Doubles
Orbetello Challenger